The following is a character list of both characters in the web series and the TV series of Making Fiends.

Main

Vendetta

Vendetta is a fictional main character in the web series and TV series of Making Fiends. She is created by Amy Winfrey and voiced by Aglaia Mortcheva, which gives her a Bulgarian accent. She first appeared in the web pilot in 2003. She appeared in all episodes, except in web episode 14, in which she was sick and stayed home from school.

Vendetta is Italian for "blood feud", and, true to her name, Vendetta is vindictive and cruel.

Role in Making Fiends
She is an evil green girl with a Bulgarian accent and the power to make fiends, both through stereotypical mad-scientist means and in the kitchen. She runs the town completely because everyone is afraid of her, except the new girl, Charlotte (or as Vendetta calls her "stupid blue girl"). Vendetta hates her and wants to destroy her with her fiends.
She is believed to be 9 or 10 years old.

Character
Voice
At first, Winfrey felt a little guilty for casting Mortcheva as the evil character. They tried to cast her as the voice actor for Charlotte, but it didn't work out as they planned it to.

Personality
Vendetta spends her time torturing the other children and using her giant bear-like hamster, Grudge, to get what she wants. She is narcissistic and rather histrionic, filling her home with pictures of herself, over-dramatizing anything negative that happens to her and desiring to be feared and respected. She constantly tries to destroy Charlotte, but her schemes are always foiled by Charlotte's kind obliviousness. She only eats clams, beef jerky, grape punch, and onions. She hates several things that are mentioned throughout the show. More often than not, she would use the word "stupid" to describe something she detests, such as Charlotte, Charlotte's grandmother, or a fiend who disobeys her. The only people she truly cares about are her parents, Viktor and Violetta, as shown in "Parentnapped" when she warned them to not hangout with Charlotte and when she rescued them from Charlotte's house after spending the day with her.

Charlotte

Charlotte is a fictional main character in the animated television series Making Fiends. She is the happy good character and the complete opposite to Vendetta. She is voiced and created by Amy Winfrey and first appeared in the pilot episode of the web series on July 14, 2003. The web series ran for 21 episodes between 2003 and 2005, and the television series aired on Nicktoons Network from October 4 to November 1, 2008.

Charlotte believes she and Vendetta are best friends. Vendetta, however, hates Charlotte and tries to destroy her with her homemade fiends. Charlotte will probably never notice that Vendetta tries to kill her. Somehow when Vendetta unleashes a fiend onto Charlotte, Charlotte always finds a way to make the fiend friendly.

Role in Making Fiends
Charlotte is a happy, blue, little girl from Vermont. She moved to Clamburg with her grandmother Charlene. Charlotte's parents are supposedly astronauts though it is also suggested that they are both dead. Charlotte believes she and Vendetta are best friends, but Vendetta wants to destroy her. Charlotte loves vegetables, cheese, pancakes, and most of all, Vendetta's fiends, which she thinks are cute animals, such as ponies and puppies. Charlotte also likes to play the tuba, play with the leaf blower, and pretend to be different things. Charlotte often phrases "tee hee!", "yippee!", and "hooray!". Charlotte's careless, innocent personality antagonizes Vendetta, and has even shown to be a danger to Clamburg in general in a few occasions. She even has broken into Vendetta's house or invited herself to other people's houses without invitation. Many scenes of her innocent antics are designed to provoke sympathy for anyone who is involved on many occasions, many times driving the victim horribly frightened.

Charlotte has a pet hamster named Buttons and a scissors fiend named Buttons 2. Charlotte's grandmother Charlene is just like her, only older. They are both always happy and see everything as friendly. They live together in a blue house with a rainbow surrounding it.

Charlotte attends Mu Elementary School in class room four with Mr. Milk teaching. She sits next to Marion, a nervous periwinkle overweight girl.
She is believed to be 9 or 10 years old.

Character
Voice
Charlotte's voice is provided by the series creator, Amy Winfrey, in a high toned voice. Aglaia Mortcheva, the voice of Vendetta, was first tried as Charlotte, but did not fit in due to her Bulgarian accent.

Personality
Charlotte is an optimistic girl and could be described as too friendly; it is difficult for her to get angry as she sees everything as lovable. When Vendetta unleashes fiends onto her, Charlotte always ruins her plans by making the fiends do useful things. Charlotte is very naive and thinks Vendetta is her best friend. She likes to pretend to be different kind of things such as postage stamps or cheese. She can hold her breath for nine hours. She likes to sing songs about such things as being small, No. 2 pencils, and Vendetta. Charlotte loves everything in the world.

Grudge
Grudge is Vendetta's giant hamster fiend. He fills the role of Vendetta's sidekick and thug enforcer. Grudge grunts and growls to express himself. In the TV series, it is expanded more on his feelings for Vendetta, showing that he really does care about her and her safety. In web episode 18, Grudge is replaced by Rubella, but is accepted again by Vendetta after helping her get rid of a music bear given from Rubella, but was fired again after hiccuping (he ate a music card given to Vendetta from Charlotte, so when he hiccuped, it played music. That was what made Vendetta replace him in the first place.) but is again accepted by Vendetta fend off her own wild fiends in web episode 20. Vendetta always refers to him as "Hamster", whereas Charlotte is the only person who refers to him as "Grudge". He is voiced by Peter Merryman.

Mr. Milk
Mr. Milk is the teacher who has the misfortune of teaching Charlotte and Vendetta's class. He is incredibly timid and never gets around to teaching due to his fear of Vendetta's reactions to his lessons. He speaks in a nervous, disjointed monotone and is afraid of the fanged red bird fiend that is constantly glaring at him. He fantasizes about being a Swiss banker and having a relationship with Mrs. Minty. He is voiced by Peter Merryman.

Secondary

Charlene
Grandma Charlene is Charlotte's grandmother, whose personality is essentially that of an older Charlotte. She runs a store that sells candy and auto parts; supposedly, she can make almost anything out of lemon drops and brake cables. She has a gigantic bookcase full of cookbooks in her kitchen, and says that she loves cookbooks and that they have "so many pretty pictures and nice recipes". Charlene does not appear in the web series. She is voiced by Amy Winfrey.

Giant Kitty
Giant Kitty is Vendetta's first fiend; Charlotte spends a lot of time with it, much to Vendetta's dismay. It has an insatiable appetite, as seen in web episode 10. It despises taking baths, as seen in the web series. When it is brushed its contented purrs shake the whole school. It is voiced by Amy Winfrey.

Buttons
Buttons is Charlotte's pet hamster, and her "favorite hamster in the whole world". He resembles a miniature Grudge. He is also very scared of Vendetta and her fiends. According to Charlotte, Buttons likes peanuts and buttons. His prominent feature is the high-pitched squeal he makes when he is scared. Charlotte is seen to use him when playing with toys as well., and his cage also is in Charlotte's room. He is sometimes seen to be scared of Charlotte as she treats him more like a plaything than a pet. He is voiced by Amy Winfrey.

Buttons 2
Scissors Fiend is a fiend Vendetta made to attack Charlotte that looks like a bird. It can cut things with its scissor-like beak. Charlotte believes it to be a puppy and made it into a good friend and pet, renaming it Buttons 2. It now enjoys cutting up construction paper. It sleeps in a drawer with many paper shreds in Charlotte's room. It is the best fiend and somehow Charlotte had turned it good the first episode she had met it.

Marvin
Marvin is a dark green schoolboy who frequently has his property or person vandalized by Vendetta's fiends. It is a running gag for Marvin to declare his loss or damage as a simple possessive exclamation, such as "My banana!", "My ice cream!", "My God!", "My cell phone!", "My spine!" etc. He has 8 younger siblings. Marvin does not pay much attention at school and dreams of someday owning a skyscraper. He is in love with another girl from another town.

Marion
Marion is a periwinkle, overweight schoolgirl who sits next to Charlotte and talks quietly. She has been planning an escape from Clamburg to Canada for years, and tries to in one episode before being stopped by one of Vendetta's fiends; because of this, she has formed a fascination with mining. She also collects glass animals. She flees at any sign of danger. She despises Vendetta for the most part, going as far as hanging pictures of Vendetta on her wall and crossing her out. Marion plays the triangle at times. When she became best friends with Vendetta, she was blinded of all the power and tried to destroy Charlotte with a fiend she created on her own. She is voiced by Amy Winfrey.

Maggie
Maggie is a dark blue school girl. She is always depressed because she has lost all hope due to Vendetta's fiends. She is convinced that she cannot change anything. She spends her free time writing poetry. Her poems, much like her school projects, are about dismal topics.  Although she fears Vendetta, she loathes Charlotte for being so happy. In the web series, she is voiced by Amy Winfrey. In the TV series, she is voiced by Madellaine Paxson.

Malachi
Malachi is a dark purple schoolboy. He speaks in Elizabethan English phrases and refuses to sing or use electronics because he believes it is blasphemous. He lives a puritan life and sees the conflicts between Charlotte and Vendetta as a struggle between good and evil, he even describes that the fiends are "unholy". He is fascinated with microwaves and thinks they work by evil magic. His parents were seen in "Parents". He is voiced by Peter Merryman.

Mort
Mort is a blue-gray schoolboy that is "friendly to the extreme". Mort is always ready to offer advice and opinions, none of which ever make sense. He has an irrational fear of soda, but a tragic love of soda cans. He was first seen in episode 19 of the web show being picked up by an ice cream fiend. Despite the fact that he was only seen rarely, he will become more developed in the television series. According to Nick's site, he is a boy who gives nonsensical advice but so far in the series this has not been shown. He appears briefly in the TV series and has only been seen in the background. In fact, he never talked in the TV series, but he screamed once. He is voiced by Peter Merryman.

Violetta and Viktor
Violetta and Viktor are Vendetta's parents that have been shrunk down and live in a hamster cage. Vendetta feeds them croutons and beans. It is possible that Vendetta used her parents to test the shrinking slug from "Shrinking Charlotte". They are both unaware of Vendetta's cruelty and evilness. Both Violetta and Viktor dislike Charlotte since the day they spent together. She used them as toys and made them do insane things. They, however, liked her at the picnic and when they had a tea party over at Charlotte's house. They are voiced by Aglaia Mortcheva and Dave Wasson, respectively. They only appear in the TV series.

Mrs. Minty
Mrs. Minty (called Ms. Minty in "Toupee" to define that she isn't married) is a substitute teacher. She is an elderly woman who, true to her name, is mint green. She refers to the classmates as "buttercups", "ducklings", and other diminutive terms of endearment. She seems to be unaware of Vendetta's reputation and abilities. She also has a fear of Grudge. As seen in the episode "Toupee", Mr. Milk has a crush on her. She is voiced by Peter Merryman.

Mrs. Millet
Mrs. Millet is the lunch lady. A red frog fiend watches over her to make sure that she always serves nothing but clams, beef jerky, and grape punch. She openly disobeyed her fiend for two days before finally caving in. She is voiced by Amy Winfrey.

Mr. Gumpit
Mr. Gumpit is a purple nervous man that owns the Giant Pet Supplies store. He is voiced by Dave Wasson and only appeared in the TV series.

Mr. Onion Man
Mr. Onion Man owns the local onion stand in Clamburg. He is seen to be the father or a relative to Maggie, as he sat with her at the parent-teacher night. He is voiced by Peter Merryman and only appeared in the TV series.

Charlotte's Parents
Charlotte's Parents were first mentioned in the television episode "Parents". They were only seen in a family picture. According to Charlotte and her grandmother Charlene, Charlotte's parents are astronauts on a space station. In the episode "Parents", Vendetta makes two look-a-like fiends to impersonate Charlotte's parents.

Rubella
Rubella is Vendetta's replacement fiend sidekick. She is a giant doll who resembles Frankenstein's monster. She eats non-edible food (like wood, glass and plaster) and talks in one- and two-word sentences. She is named after a disease of the same name. She thinks of Vendetta as her friend rather than boss, and gave her a musical toy bear, which angered Vendetta and let her to abandonment. She is voiced by Elissa Calfin, and only appears in the web series.

Crush
Crush is a fiend made by Vendetta to crush anyone, primarily Charlotte, if that person sings. It does not attack just singing people; it also attacked a radio that played music. He is  voiced by Peter Merryman.

Smash
Smash is a fiend Vendetta made to flatten Charlotte in the TV episode "Smash". Smash was made with a purple liquid (liquid and measuring cup), Fiend mix, a cymbal monkey, and a picture of Charlotte so the fiend would only attack her. To Vendetta's dismay, the Smash smashed her and Charlotte together. Eventually, Grudge got smashed together with them when he tried to protect Vendetta. Smash was going to smash them one last time, but due to Grudge being smashed together with them they smelled bad. It is unknown what happened to Smash after he ran away due to the terrible smell. He is voiced by Peter Merryman.

Burly Fiend
The Burly fiend is a fiend made by Vendetta to steal things. He often makes mistakes, like when Vendetta told him to find her parents, Viktor and Violetta, but instead, he stole, as Vendetta put it, "Charlotte's stupid grandmother!" His punishment is no snacks for the whole night and then the guard fiends took him away. He started crying when that happened, so he must really like food. Like Crush and Smash, He only appears in the TV Series, and is voiced by Peter Merryman.

See also 
 Amy Winfrey
 Web cartoon
 TV series

References

Making Friends
Making Fiends